This article list the results of women's doubles category in the 2007 BWF World Championships (World Badminton Championships).

Seeds 

  Zhang Yawen / Wei Yili (semi-finals)
  Gao Ling / Huang Sui (final)
  Yang Wei / Zhang Jiewen (world champions)
  Du Jing / Yu Yang (withdrew)
  Gail Emms / Donna Kellogg (quarter-finals)
  Kumiko Ogura / Reiko Shiota (semi-finals)
  Jiang Yanmei / Li Yujia (quarter-finals)
  Wong Pei Tty / Chin Eei Hui (quarter-finals)

  Lee Kyung-won / Lee Hyo-jung (third round)
  Endang Nursugianti / Rani Mundiasti (third round)
  Kamila Augustyn / Nadieżda Kostiuczyk (first round)
  Aki Akao / Tomomi Matsuda (third round)
  Miyuki Maeda / Satoko Suetsuna (third round)
  Nicole Grether / Juliane Schenk (third round)
  Lena Frier Kristiansen / Kamilla Rytter Juhl (third round)
  Petya Nedelcheva / Diana Dimova (second round)

Draw

Finals

Top half

Section 1

Section 2

Bottom half

Section 3

Section 4

Source 
Tournamentsoftware.com: 2007 World Championships - Women's doubles

- Womens doubles, 2007 Bwf World Championships
BWF
2007 in Malaysian women's sport